Recurrent artery may refer to

 Anterior tibial recurrent artery
 Anterior ulnar recurrent artery
 Interosseous recurrent artery
 Posterior tibial recurrent artery
 Posterior ulnar recurrent artery
 Radial recurrent artery
 Recurrent artery of Heubner
 Ulnar recurrent artery (disambiguation), various meanings